The Lucius Knowles House is a historic house located at 838 Main Street in Worcester, Massachusetts. It is locally significant as one of the city's best preserved Second Empire style buildings.

Description and history 
The three-story, wood-framed house was built around 1870 for industrialist Lucius Knowles, best known for his innovations in the manufacture of looms. It has a symmetrical front facade with mansard roof, and a front entry sheltered by an elaborately decorated porch. Another entry on the south side also had a decorated porch, now glassed in, above which there is an oriel window. A unique music room was added to the northeast corner of the house around 1880, to a design by Stephen Earle, which featured stained glass skylights (now covered over but still in place).

The house was listed on the National Register of Historic Places on March 5, 1980.

See also
National Register of Historic Places listings in southwestern Worcester, Massachusetts
National Register of Historic Places listings in Worcester County, Massachusetts

References

Houses in Worcester, Massachusetts
Italianate architecture in Massachusetts
Houses completed in 1870
National Register of Historic Places in Worcester, Massachusetts
Houses on the National Register of Historic Places in Worcester County, Massachusetts